Elizabeth Carew (née Bryan;  – 1546) was an English courtier and reputed mistress of King Henry VIII. 

A daughter of Sir Thomas Bryan and Margaret Bourchier, Elizabeth became the wife of Henry VIII's close friend Sir Nicholas Carew, an influential statesman who was eventually executed for his alleged involvement in the Exeter Conspiracy. 

Her brother, Sir Francis, a member of the Privy Chamber and one of the king's closest friends, was responsible for sitting in the jury that convicted his sister's husband, who was sentenced to death, and thus reduced her to penury.

Life

She was a first half-cousin of both Anne Boleyn and Catherine Howard and a second half-cousin of Jane Seymour, which increased her standing at court. Her only brother was Sir Francis Bryan, called "the Vicar of Hell" for his lack of principles. She is said to have been friends with Bessie Blount, Henry's mistress who produced an illegitimate son in 1519. Her mother, Margaret Bourchier, was a half-sister of Anne Boleyn's mother, Elizabeth Howard, and also of Catherine Howard's father, Edmund Howard, sharing the same mother but different fathers. With Jane Seymour they both shared a great-grandmother; their grandmothers were half-sisters who shared the same mother but had different fathers.

In 1514, there were rumours that Elizabeth Bryan was the mistress of Henry VIII, although it may have been his brother-in-law, Charles Brandon, 1st Duke of Suffolk who was the object of her affection. The king made huge presents to her over the years, including royal jewels.

Elizabeth Bryan had been raised at court because of her parents who both held offices in the royal household. In the early, halcyon days of the reign, Elizabeth and her future husband were members of the king's inner social circle and performed regularly in the masques and dances that were among his favorite pastimes. Henry almost certainly arranged their marriage: he attended their wedding and endowed them with a gift of 50 marks' worth of land. In those years, the king showered Elizabeth Bryan with "beautiful diamonds and pearls and innumerable jewels."

Issue
Her children with Nicholas Carew were:
Anne Carew (about 1520 – 1581)
Married the diplomat Nicholas Throckmorton.
Their daughter Elizabeth married Sir Walter Raleigh.
Sir Francis Carew of Beddington (1530 – 1611)
Was restored to Nicholas' estates, though he preferred to stay out of politics.
Unmarried. Adopted his nephew, Nicholas Throckmorton, who adopted his name.
Mary Carew (born about 1520)
Married Sir Arthur Darcy.
They had ten sons and five daughters.
Elizabeth Carew
Isabel Carew (born about 1530)
Married Nicholas Saunders. They had three sons and four daughters.

Sir Nicholas was executed for his alleged involvement in the Exeter Conspiracy in 1540, leaving Elizabeth and the children destitute.

See also
List of English royal mistresses

References

1500s births
1546 deaths
Elizabeth
16th-century English women
Elizabeth
Mistresses of Henry VIII
Wives of knights
Year of birth uncertain